Farajabad (also Romanized as Farajābād) is a village in Hasan Reza Rural District, in the Central District of Juybar County, Mazandaran Province, Iran. At the 2006 census, its population was 31, in 10 families.

References 

Populated places in Juybar County